Birutė was the second wife of Kęstutis, Grand Duke of Lithuania.

Birute or Birutė may also refer to:

Places
 Birutė Hill, Palanga, Lithuania; a hill that formerly hosted a pagan shrine famous in Lithuanian history and myth
 212977 Birutė, the minor planet, the 212977th registered, an inner Solar System asteroid

People
 Biruta (given name) or Birutė, a Lithuanian and Latvian female given name
 Birutė (mythology) or Biruta, mythologized version of the wife of Kęstutis, the priestess of Palanga, worshipped as a deity

Other uses
 Birutė Society, the first cultural non-religious society of Prussian Lithuanians
 Birutė (opera), the first Lithuanian opera (1906)
 Birutė, a brand of bottle water manufactured by Volfas Engelman
 Grand Duchess Birute Uhlan Battalion, Lithuanian Armed Forces

See also

 Biruta (disambiguation)